Koninklijke Voetbal Vereniging or Koninklijke Voetbalvereniging (KVV) means "Royal Football Association" is often used in Dutch and Belgian association football clubs, such as:

Club Brugge KV, a football club based in Bruges, Belgium
K.V. Turnhout
K.V.V. Crossing Elewijt, a Belgian association football club from the village of Elewijt
K.V.V. Belgica Edegem Sport, a Belgian association football club from the municipality of Edegem
K. Sint-Truidense V.V.

See also  
 KV (disambiguation)
 KVV (disambiguation)